In six-dimensional geometry, a runcic 6-cube is a convex uniform 6-polytope. There are 2 unique runcic for the 6-cube.

Runcic 6-cube

Alternate names 
 Cantellated 6-demicube/demihexeract
 Small rhombated hemihexeract (Acronym sirhax) (Jonathan Bowers)

Cartesian coordinates 
The Cartesian coordinates for the vertices of a runcic 6-cube centered at the origin are coordinate permutations:
 (±1,±1,±1,±3,±3,±3)
with an odd number of plus signs.

Images

Related polytopes

Runcicantic 6-cube

Alternate names 
 Cantitruncated 6-demicube/demihexeract
 Great rhombated hemihexeract (Acronym girhax) (Jonathan Bowers)

Cartesian coordinates 
The Cartesian coordinates for the vertices of a runcicantic 6-cube centered at the origin are coordinate permutations:
 (±1,±1,±3,±5,±5,±5)
with an odd number of plus signs.

Images

Related polytopes 

This polytope is based on the 6-demicube, a part of a dimensional family of uniform polytopes called demihypercubes for being alternation of the hypercube family.

There are 47 uniform polytopes with D6 symmetry, 31 are shared by the B6 symmetry, and 16 are unique:

Notes

References 
 H.S.M. Coxeter: 
 H.S.M. Coxeter, Regular Polytopes, 3rd Edition, Dover New York, 1973 
 Kaleidoscopes: Selected Writings of H.S.M. Coxeter, edited by F. Arthur Sherk, Peter McMullen, Anthony C. Thompson, Asia Ivic Weiss, Wiley-Interscience Publication, 1995,  
 (Paper 22) H.S.M. Coxeter, Regular and Semi Regular Polytopes I, [Math. Zeit. 46 (1940) 380-407, MR 2,10]
 (Paper 23) H.S.M. Coxeter, Regular and Semi-Regular Polytopes II, [Math. Zeit. 188 (1985) 559-591]
 (Paper 24) H.S.M. Coxeter, Regular and Semi-Regular Polytopes III, [Math. Zeit. 200 (1988) 3-45]
 Norman Johnson Uniform Polytopes, Manuscript (1991)
 N.W. Johnson: The Theory of Uniform Polytopes and Honeycombs, Ph.D. 
  x3o3o *b3x3o3o, x3x3o *b3x3o3o

External links 
 
 Polytopes of Various Dimensions
 Multi-dimensional Glossary

6-polytopes